Hathiagor Buddhist Caves are located at village Pagaria in the state of Rajasthan, India. The caves are located on hill called Hathiagor-ki-Pahadi. The group has five caves measuring 5 m x 5 m x 7 m. A stupa is located closer to the caves.

See also

PROTECTED MONUMENTS BY ARCHAEOLOGICAL SURVEY OF INDIA IN RAJASTHAN
Some Buddhist Antiquities and Monuments of Rajasthan

Citations

Buddhist monasteries in India
Buddhist caves in India
Tourist attractions in Jhalawar district
Indian rock-cut architecture
Former populated places in India
Buddhist pilgrimage sites in India
Architecture in India
Caves containing pictograms in India
Caves of Rajasthan
Buddhism in Rajasthan